
Donald Black (born 1941) is a University Professor of the Social Sciences at the University of Virginia.  Black received his Ph.D. in sociology from the University of Michigan in 1968, and he taught at Yale and Harvard before moving to Virginia in 1985.

Black is the author of The Behavior of Law, The Manners and Customs of the Police, and Sociological Justice, all of which present various aspects of his theory of law. More recently, The Social Structure of Right and Wrong extends the theory to address conflict management more broadly.  It thus focuses on instances where people handle conflicts through means other than the law, such as through gossip, avoidance, suicide, or feuding.  Black's latest book, Moral Time, identifies the causes of moral conflict in all human relationships.

Black is also the founder of pure sociology, a distinctive theoretical approach that explains human behavior with its social geometry.  Since pure sociology is a general sociological paradigm, it may be applied to subjects other than law, conflict, and conflict management—for example, art, religion, and ideas.

See also
Legal behavior

References

Further reading

Works by Black 

 1970.	“Production of Crime Rates.”  American Sociological Review 35:733-748.
 1971.	“The Social Organization of Arrest.”  Stanford Law Review 23:1087-1111.
 1972.	“The Boundaries of Legal Sociology.”  Yale Law Journal 81:1086-1100.
 1973.	“The Mobilization of Law.”  Journal of Legal Studies 2:125-149.
 1973.	“Introduction.”  Pages 1–14 in The Social Organization of Law, edited by Donald Black and Maureen Mileski.  New York:  Academic Press.
 1976.	The Behavior of Law.  New York:  Academic Press.
 1979.	“Common Sense in the Sociology of Law.”  American Sociological Review 44(1):18-27.
 1979.	“A Note on the Measurement of Law.”  Informationsbrief für Rechtssoziologie, Sonderheft 2:92-106.
 1979. “A Strategy of Pure Sociology.” Pages 149–168 in Theoretical Perspectives in Sociology, edited by Scott G. McNall. New York: St. Martin's Press.
 1980.	The Manners and Customs of the Police.  New York:  Academic Press.
 1981.	“The Relevance of Legal Anthropology.”  Contemporary Sociology 10(1):43-46.
 1983.	“Crime as Social Control.”  American Sociological Review 48:34-45.
 1984.	Toward a General Theory of Social Control, Volume 1:  Fundamentals.  Orlando:  Academic Press. (editor)
 1984.	“Preface.” Toward a General Theory of Social Control, Volume 1:  Fundamentals, edited by Donald Black.  Orlando:  Academic Press.
 1984.	“Social Control as a Dependent Variable.”  In Toward a General Theory of Social Control, Volume 1:  Fundamentals, edited by Donald Black.  Orlando:  Academic Press.  (editor)
 1984.	Toward a General Theory of Social Control, Volume 2:  Selected Problems.  Orlando:  Academic Press.  (editor)
 1984.	“Preface.” Toward a General Theory of Social Control, Volume 2:  Selected Problems, edited by Donald Black.  Orlando:  Academic Press.
 1984.	“Crime as Social Control.”  Pages 1–27 in Toward a General Theory of Social Control, Volume 2:  Selected Problems, edited by Donald Black.  Orlando:  Academic Press.
 1984.	“Jurocracy in America.”  The Tocqueville Review – La Revue Tocquevelle 6:273-281.
 1987.	“Compensation and the Social Structure of Misfortune.”  Law & Society Review 21(4):563-584.
 1987.	“A Note on the Sociology of Islamic Law.”  Pages 47–62 in Perspectives on Islamic Law, Justice and Society, edited by Ravindra S. Khare.  Working Papers, Number 3.  Charlottesville:  Center for Advanced Studies University of Virginia.
 1989.	Sociological Justice.  New York:  Oxford University Press.
 1990.	“The Elementary Forms of Conflict Management.”  In New Direction in the Study of Justice, Law, and Social Control, prepared by the School of Justice Studies, Arizona State University.  New York:  Plenum Press.
 1991.	“Relative Justice.”  Litigation 18:32-35.
 1992.	“Social Control of the Self.”  Pages 39–49 in Virginia Review of Sociology:  Law and Conflict Management, edited by James Tucker.  Greenwich:  JAI Press Inc.
 1993.	“La Mobilisation du Droit:  Autobiographie d’un Concept:  (The Mobilization of Law:  Autobiography of a Concept”).  Pages 376–378 in Dictionnaire Encyclopédique de Théorie et de Sociologie de Droit, under the direction of André-Jean Arnaud.  Paris:  Librairie, Générale de Droit et de Jurisprudence.
 1995.	“The Epistemology of Pure Sociology.”  Law and Social Inquiry 20:829-870.\
 1997.	“The Lawyerization of Legal Sociology.”  Amici (Newsletter of the Sociology of Law Section, American Sociological Association) 5:4-7.
 1998.	The Social Structure of Right and Wrong.  San Diego:  Academic Press.
 2000.	“On the Origin of Morality.”  Journal of Consciousness Studies 7:107-1191.
 2000.	“The Purification of Sociology.”  Contemporary Sociology 29(5):704-709.
 2000.	“Dreams of Pure Sociology.”  Sociological Theory 18(3):343-367.
 2002.	“The Geometry of Law:  An Interview with Donald Black”, by Aaron Bell.  International Journal of the Sociology of Law 30:101-129.
 2002.	“Terrorism as Social Control.  Part I:  The Geometry of Destruction.”  American Sociological Association Crime, Law, and Deviance Newsletter Spring:3-5.
 2002.	“Terrorism as Social Control.  Part II:  The Geometry of Retaliation.”  American Sociological Association Crime, Law, and Deviance Newsletter Summer:3-5.
 2002.	“Pure Sociology and the Geometry of Discovery.”  In Toward a New Science of Sociology:  A Retrospective Evaluation of The Behavior of Law, by Allan V. Horwitz.  Contemporary Sociology 31(6):668-674.
 2004.	“The Geometry of Terrorism.”  In “Theories of Terrorism,” symposium edited by Roberta Senechal de la Roche.  Sociological Theory 22:14-25.
 2004.	“Violent Structures.”  Pages 145–158 in Violence: From Theory to Research, edited by Margaret A. Zahn, Henry H. Brownstein, and Shelly L. Jackson.  Cincinnati:  Anderson Publishing Company.
 2004.	“Terrorism as Social Control.”  In Terrorism and Counter-Terrorism:  Criminological Perspectives, edited by Mathieu Deflem.  New York:  Elsevier Ltd.
 2007.	“Legal Relativity.” In the Encyclopedia of Law and Society: American and Global Perspectives, Volume 3, edited by David S. Clark. Thousand Oaks, CA: Sage Publications.
 2010.  “How Law Behaves:  An Interview with Donald Black,” by Mara Abramowitz.  International Journal of Law, Crime and Justice 38:37-47.
 2010.  The Behavior of Law (Special Edition).  Bingley, England:  Emerald.
 2011.  Moral Time.  New York:  Oxford University Press.

Related sources 

Works relying heavily upon Black's theoretical approach, including his epistemology and his explanatory model. See also, references section of Pure Sociology.
 Baumgartner, M.P. 1988. The Moral Order of the Suburb. New York: Oxford University Press.
 . 1992. "War and peace in early childhood". Pages 1–38 in Virginia Review of Sociology Volume I, edited by James Tucker. Orlando: Academic Press.
 Borg, Marian J. 1992. "Conflict management and the modern world-system". Sociological Forum 7:261-282.
 Campbell, Bradley.  2010. “Contradictory Behavior During Genocides.”  Sociological Forum 25(2):296-314.
 Cooney, Mark. 1997. "From Warre to Tyranny: Lethal Conflict and the State." American Sociological Review 62 (2): 316–338.
 . 1997b. "The Decline of Elite Homicide." Criminology 35(3): 381–407.
 . 1998. Warriors and Peacemakers: How Third Parties Shape Violence. New York: New York University Press.
 Morrill, Calvin. 1995. The Executive Way: Conflict Management in Corporations. Chicago: The University of Chicago Press.
 Senechal de la Roche, Roberta.  1996.	“Collective Violence as Social Control.”  Sociological Forum 11(1):97-128.
 Tucker, James. 1993. "Everyday Forms of Employee Resistance". Sociological Forum 8: 25–45.
 _. 1999. The Therapeutic Corporation. New York: Oxford University Press.

Critical references 
Greenberg, David F.  1983.  "Donald Black's Sociology of Law:  A Critique."  Law and Society Review 17:337-368.
Hunt, Alan. 1983. "Behavioral Sociology of Law: A Critique of Donald Black". Journal of law and society 10 (1): 19–46.
Marshall, Douglas A. 2008. “The Dangers of Purity: On the Incompatibility of ‘Pure Sociology’ and Science” The Sociological Quarterly 49(2): 209–235.
Marshall, Douglas A. 2008. “Taking the Rhetoric out of Theoretic Debate: A Rejoinder to Michalski” The Sociological Quarterly 49(2): 275–284.
Smith, Christian.  2010.  "Network Structuralism's Missing Persons."  Chapter 4 of What is a Person?: Rethinking Humanity, Social Life, and the Moral Good from the Person Up.  University of Chicago Press.
Wong, Kam C.  1995.  "Black's Theory on the Behavior of Law Revisited."  International Journal of the Sociology of Law 23(1):189-232.

External links
 
 Black's Theory of Law and Social Control, Oxford Bibliographies Online

Living people
American legal writers
American sociologists
University of Michigan College of Literature, Science, and the Arts alumni
Harvard Law School faculty
University of Virginia faculty
1941 births